There are 72 mosques in Singapore. Almost all the mosques in Singapore are administered by Majlis Ugama Islam Singapura, with the exception of Masjid Temenggong Daeng Ibrahim which is administered by the Malaysian state of Johor. Twenty-three mosques were built using the Masjid Building and Mendaki Fund (MBMF), the most recent being Masjid Al-Mawaddah which officially opened in May 2009.

See also
 Islam in Singapore
 Lists of mosques

References

External links

https://www.muis.gov.sg/mosque
https://www.muis.gov.sg/mosque/Our-Mosques/Mosque-Directory
https://www.muis.gov.sg/mosque/Mosque-Infrastructure/Mosque-Building/MBMF-Mosque
https://www.muis.gov.sg/mosque/Mosque-Infrastructure/Mosque-Building/Wakaf-Mosque
https://www.muis.gov.sg/mosque/Mosque-Infrastructure/Mosque-Building/Other-Mosque
https://www.onemap.sg/main/v2/

 
Singapore
Mosques